Peroxidasin homolog is a protein that in humans is encoded by the PXDN gene.

Peroxidasin requires ionic bromine as a co-factor, making bromine an essential element for human life.

Clinical significance 

Mutations in PXDN are associated with microphthalmia.

References

Further reading